Ferragus (Full title: Ferragus, chef des Dévorants; English: Ferragus, Chief of the Devorants) is an 1833 novel by French author Honoré de Balzac (1799–1850) and included in the Scènes de la vie parisienne section of his novel sequence La Comédie humaine. It is part of his trilogy Histoire des treize: Ferragus is the first part, the second is La Duchesse de Langeais and the third is The Girl with the Golden Eyes. Ferragus first appeared in the Revue de Paris and was then published by the firm Charles-Béchet.

Plot

The novel is set around the year 1820. Auguste de Maulincour, a young cavalry officer, walking in a Parisian district of ill repute, sees from afar a young married woman, Clemence, with whom he is secretly in love. He sees her enter a house of ill repute. The young married woman is widely recognized in Parisian society as a paragon of marital virtue—what is her secret? Auguste decides to spy on the woman to find out. He finds her in the company of a man named Ferragus.  In the days that follow, Auguste uncovers the secrets of powerful and mysterious people and escapes several assassination attempts. Subsequently, Auguste is killed, but before he dies, he reveals Clemence's secret to her husband, Jules Desmarets, a very rich stockbroker. Ferragus is none other than Clemence's father.

It is revealed that Ferragus used to be a rich, handsome boy, a member of the Order of Devorants, who was imprisoned in 1806. He had escaped imprisonment and lived in Paris under various names and disguises. In 1815, Ferragus became involved in several sordid businesses.

The novel has a tragic theme, with the death of both Auguste and Clemence, as well as the despair of Jules and the physical decrepitude of Ferragus.

Film versions
 Ferragus, a film version (1910) of Balzac's novel by André Calmettes
 Ferragus, a film version (1920) of Balzac's novel by Giovanni Enrico Vidali
 Ferragus, a film version (1923) of Balzac's novel by Gaston Ravel
 Die Dreizehn (The Thirteen), a film version (1918) of Balzac's novel by Alfred Halm

References

Books of La Comédie humaine
Novels set in 19th-century France
1833 French novels
Fiction set in 1820
Novels set in the 1820s
Novels set in Paris
French novels adapted into films
Novels by Honoré de Balzac